Mobile Theatre, is a form of popular theatre exclusive to Assam. Unlike Street plays, Mobile Theatre groups travel from place to place with their cast, singers, musicians, dancers and crew, often carrying tents and seating with them.

History 
The Kohinoor Opera was the first mobile theatre group of Assam, founded by Natyacharya Brajanath Sarma, in 1930. Kohinoor Opera performed dramas, attracting thousands of spectators, from Dhubri to Sadiya. The first Mobile Theatre play was staged on 2 October 1963, in Pathsala. Achyut Lahkar is known as the father of Mobile Theatre. Lahkar's group, the Pathsala-based Nataraj Cine Theatre, was popular during the early years. His productions included: Bhogjora, Tikendrajit, Black Money, Beula. Lahkar took Mobile Theatres to Bihar, West Bengal and Uttar Pradesh. They collaborated with artists from multiple states. An industry with an annual turnover of around 100 million, the Mobile Theatre of Assam provide a source of entertainment that has progressively upgraded its stature.

Form 
The Mobile Theatre of Assam has things in common with the Jatra of West Bengal, e.g. the performance on makeshift stages and are mobile. The Mobile Theatre is more advanced technically and evolved from mythological stories, to contemporary themes. The self-contained nature of Mobile Theatre allows performances in small villages without their own performance spaces, which was particularly important in villages without electricity for television. Troupes offer plays including adaptations of popular Assamese novels, Greek Classics and Hollywood blockbusters. There are over 30 mobile theatre groups in Assam, most of them based in Pathsala. In mid-September, after two months of rehearsals, the groups begin their seven-month tour in Assam.

Special effects 
In 2008 Kohinoor Theatre staged Abuj Dora, Achin Kanya, the tale of a dwarf and his two friends of normal size. Jatin Bora played three roles. In one he was transformed in a dwarf. From lighting effects to specially tailored clothes and help from technicians, the producers were able to preserve the illusion. A local version of Superman was put on by Ashirbad Theatre. The protagonist flew around the stage with powers provided by his costume. In Deboraj Theatre's play, the role of a Dracula inspired Vampire appeared on stage. The group brought to life the blood sucking scenes in the play with technical help.

Dance drama 
Some theatre groups precede the main play with a short Nritya Natika or dance drama (নৃত্য-নাটিকা) which is mostly dance based. Here dialogues are recited from background and the artists are supposed to mime it accordingly.

See also 
 Achyut Lahkar 
 Kohinoor Theatre 
 Brindabon Theatre
 Theatre Surjya

References

External links 

 https://www.thehindu.com/entertainment/theatre/assams-fascinating-theatrical-traditions/article24928101.ece

Theatre in India
Culture of Assam
Theatre by culture